Justice Syed Usman Ali Shah was a former governor  of the Khyber-Pakhtunkhwa province of Pakistan. He remained the Chief Justice of Peshawar High Court from 19 December 1981 to 7 December 1987. He was also the Federal Ombudsman of Pakistan from 28 March 1991 to 27 March 1995. He died on 25 June 2020 at his residence in University Town, Peshawar.

References

Living people
Governors of Khyber Pakhtunkhwa
Chief Justices of the Peshawar High Court
Year of birth missing (living people)